Cyclooctyne is the cycloalkyne with a formula .  Its molecule has a ring of 8 carbon atoms, connected by seven single bonds and one triple bond.

Cyclooctyne is the smallest cycloalkyne that is stable enough to be isolated, although the chemical is still highly reactive. The alkyne region of the structure attempts to adopt a linear molecular geometry, but the nature of the ring creates substantial ring strain. As a result, cyclooctyne and other compounds containing this ring structure readily react in ways that reduce the ring strain by converting the alkyne to a functional group that does not require linear geometry. An important application of this reactivity is in click chemistry, where cyclooctynes undergo cycloaddition reactions with azides or nitrones, forming triazoles or isoxazolines, respectively.

References

External links

Alkynes
Eight-membered rings